Kabaddi was introduced in 1985 Games. There were no Kabaddi tournament in 1984 version. India is the most successful team.

Men's

Final Standings

Women's

Final Standings

External links
 2019 South Asian Games

South Asian Games
Sports at the South Asian Games
Kabaddi at the South Asian Games
Sports originating in South Asia